The Gibson House was a well-known and well-regarded hotel in Cincinnati, Ohio, and the precursor of the Hotel Gibson.  The Gibson House was located on Main St. between 4th & 5th (south of Fountain Square) until the 1970s.

History
The Gibson House was opened about February 1849 on Walnut Street between Fourth and Fifth Street, on the west side of the street, in Cincinnati, OH.  The first proprietors were J.K. and D.V. Bennett. It was considered the "best house in the city" within a year. The hotel was financed by Peter Gibson, a Scottish immigrant who was born October 20, 1802, and emigrated to America in 1831. Many wall decorations and frescoes were painted by the artist William A. Thien, who lived in Cincinnati for a time.

During World War II, Gibson House was used as an internment camp for German-Americans.

During the first season of professional baseball, on several occasions the fans would meet the Cincinnati Red Stockings baseball team and escort them to the Gibson House where celebrations and banquets were held.

The House was often used to greet VIPs who visited Cincinnati, such as Rutherford B. Hayes, who visited Cincinnati September 15, 1877.

The original Gibson House was demolished in 1912 after being destroyed by fire and was redeveloped as the Sheraton-Gibson hotel.

John F. Kennedy stayed there during his 1960 presidential campaign.

The Sheraton-Gibson closed on July 15, 1974. The hotel was demolished in 1977 to make way for a new hotel complex.

References

External links
Image of original Gibson House
Link to 1860 Gibson House menu - University of Houston Digital Library

1977 disestablishments in Ohio
Hotels in Cincinnati
History of Cincinnati
Demolished buildings and structures in Ohio
Demolished hotels in the United States
Buildings and structures demolished in 1977